WDRT (91.9 FM “Driftless Community Radio”) is a radio station that broadcasts a community radio format. Licensed to Viroqua, Wisconsin, United States, it serves the Driftless Region in Southwest Wisconsin. WDRT first began broadcasting in 2010. The station is currently owned by Driftless Community Radio Inc.

History

WDRT started as an Internet audio stream on June 30, 2005, while Driftless Community Radio, Inc. (DCR) was waiting for the US FCC to accept applications for new non-commercial radio stations. radiodriftless.org (now defunct) streamed audio, both live and pre-recorded for four years.

After negotiating a buyout with a competitive license application in Sparta, Wisconsin, DCR was granted a construction permit by the FCC on March 24, 2009. Per FCC rules, DCR had three years to complete the construction of the station.

In September 2009 DCR leased a 1,400-square-foot space on Viroqua's Main Street for its studios, and commenced studio construction.

A year later on September 17, 2010, WDRT began broadcasting on its assigned frequency, 91.9 MHz and has broadcast (more or less) continuously since then.

See also
List of community radio stations in the United States

References

External links

FCC Public File for WDRT

Community radio stations in the United States
Driftless Area
Radio stations established in 2010
DRT
Vernon County, Wisconsin